State Route 120 (SR 120) is a state highway in Churchill County, Nevada. It connects U.S. Route 95 (US 95) to State Route 119 just outside Naval Air Station Fallon.

Route description
State Route 120 begins south of the city of Fallon, at the intersection of US 95 and Pasture Road. From there, the route follows Pasture Road eastward through agricultural and farmlands south of Fallon. At this point, the highway turns northward to traverse through more agricultural areas. SR 120 reaches its terminus at the southwest corner of Naval Air Station Fallon, at the intersection of Pasture Road and Berney Road (SR 119), although Pasture Road continues north to access the airbase.

History
SR 120 was designated in 1976.

Major intersections

See also

References

120
Transportation in Churchill County, Nevada